The Matchmaker is a 1958 American comedy film directed by Joseph Anthony. The film stars Shirley Booth in her final film, Anthony Perkins, and Shirley MacLaine. The screenplay by John Michael Hayes is based on the 1955 play of the same name by Thornton Wilder. The costumes were by Edith Head.

Plot
Set in 1884, the story focuses on Dolly Gallagher Levi, a widow who supports herself by a variety of means, with matchmaking as her primary source of income. Horace Vandergelder, a wealthy but miserly merchant from Yonkers, New York, has hired her to find him a wife, but unbeknownst to him Dolly is determined to fill the position herself. When he expresses his intent to travel to New York City to woo milliner Irene Molloy, Dolly shows him the photograph of a woman she calls Miss Ernestina Simple and tells him the buxom beauty would be a far better choice for him. Horace agrees to have dinner with Ernestina at the Harmonia Gardens after visiting Irene.

Meanwhile, Horace's head clerk Cornelius Hackl convinces his sidekick Barnaby Tucker that they, too, deserve an outing to New York. The two cause cans of tomatoes to explode, spewing their contents about the store, which justifies their closing it for the day and heading to the city. While there, they come across Irene's hat shop and Cornelius is instantly taken with her. The pair are forced to hide however, when Mr. Vandergelder and Dolly arrive. Though Dolly and Irene cover up for them, Mr. Vandergelder still realizes that Irene is hiding people in her shop (though he doesn't know who) and leaves in disgust. Irene furiously demands that Cornelius and Barnaby repay her by taking her and the shop assistant Minnie out to a fancy restaurant for dinner (Dolly had led her to believe that the men were secretly members of high society).

By total coincidence, Cornelius, Barnaby, Irene, Minnie, Horace, and Dolly all dine at the same restaurant. Horace realizes that Dolly tricked him and that there is no such person as Ernestina Simple. Cornelius worries over how to pay for the meal until a well-meaning diner gives him Mr. Vandergelder's wallet (which the diner believes Cornelius dropped). Over the course of the evening, Irene and Cornelius fall in love as Barnaby falls for Minnie. The two men escape being caught by Mr. Vandergelder by disguising themselves as women and dancing towards the door. Before going, they leave the two women a note confessing who they really are and that they love them.

The next day, Dolly and Cornelius pretend to be setting up a store of their own across the street from Mr. Vandergelders. Frightened by the competition, Horace gives the shopkeepers better working hours and wages. Realizing how foolishly he's been acting, he agrees to marry Dolly as well.

Production
Don Hartman acquired the story for Paramount Pictures and took it over when he left Paramount to become an independent producer. He died shortly before its release.

Hello, Dolly!
The 1964 Broadway musical Hello Dolly! starring Carol Channing and the 1969 film of the same name with Barbra Streisand and Walter Matthau were both based upon Wilder's play.

See also
 Hello, Dolly! (1969)
 List of American films of 1958
 Matchmaking

References

External links
 
 

1958 films
1958 romantic comedy films
American romantic comedy films
American films based on plays
Cross-dressing in American films
Films based on adaptations
Films set in New York City
Films set in the 19th century
Films set in 1884
American black-and-white films
Paramount Pictures films
Films directed by Joseph Anthony
Films with screenplays by John Michael Hayes
Films scored by Adolph Deutsch
A Day Well Spent
1950s English-language films
1950s American films